Jubb Hamza, also spelled Jeb Hamza or Dżubb Hamza, is a village located  south of Manbij in northern Syria. In the 2004 census, it had a population of 2089.

References

Aleppo